Michel Petit (born February 12, 1964) is a Canadian former professional ice hockey player who played in the National Hockey League (NHL) from the 1982–83 NHL season to the 1998–99 NHL season. Upon his retirement Petit had played for a then-NHL record ten different teams, a mark has since been surpassed by Mike Sillinger.

Playing career
As a youth, Petit played in the Quebec International Pee-Wee Hockey Tournament four consecutive years from 1974 to 1977, with a minor ice hockey team from Pont-Rouge.

Petit was drafted by the Vancouver Canucks in the 1982 NHL Entry Draft in the first round, eleventh overall. During his 17 seasons in the NHL he played for ten different NHL teams, which as of 2017 was tied along with J. J. Daigneault, Mathieu Schneider, Jim Dowd, Olli Jokinen and Lee Stempniak as the second-most by any player. Petit was the first to hit the ten-team mark.

Petit played for the Vancouver Canucks (1982–83 – 1987–88), New York Rangers (1987–88 – 1988–89), Quebec Nordiques (1989–90 – 1990–91), Toronto Maple Leafs (1990–91 – 1991–92), Calgary Flames (1992–93 – 1993–94), Los Angeles Kings (1994–95 – 1995–96), Tampa Bay Lightning (1995–96), Edmonton Oilers (1996–97), Philadelphia Flyers (1996–97), and Phoenix Coyotes (1997–98) (1998–99).

In his 17 seasons of playing hockey, he amassed a total of 90 goals, 238 assists, 328 points, 1839 penalty minutes, and 827 games played.

Personal life
Currently, Petit resides in The Woodlands, Texas and is a sales manager for Smart Sand, working in Canada and the US. Petit won the 2019 Member Guest at Traditions Club in 2019.

Career statistics

Regular season and playoffs

International

References

External links
 

1964 births
Calgary Flames players
Canadian ice hockey defencemen
Chicago Wolves (IHL) players
Detroit Vipers players
Edmonton Oilers players
Frankfurt Lions players
Fredericton Express players
Ice hockey people from Quebec
Las Vegas Thunder players
Living people
Los Angeles Kings players
National Hockey League first-round draft picks
New York Rangers players
Philadelphia Flyers players
Phoenix Coyotes players
Quebec Nordiques players
Saint-Jean Castors players
Sherbrooke Castors players
Tampa Bay Lightning players
Toronto Maple Leafs players
Vancouver Canucks draft picks
Vancouver Canucks players
Canadian expatriate ice hockey players in Germany